Monstrous is a South Korean streaming television series starring   Koo Kyo-hwan and Shin Hyun-been. The series was made available for streaming on April 29, 2022.

Synopsis 
A supernatural thriller story about archaeologists unveiling a strange mystery.

Cast

Main 
 Koo Kyo-hwan as Jeong Ki-hoon.
An eccentric archaeologist who studies strange supernatural phenomena. The ex-husband of Lee Soo-jin.
Shin Hyun-been as Lee Soo-jin. A genius pattern interpreter who faces a terrible disaster

Supporting 
 Kwak Dong-yeon as Kwak Yong-joo
 Nam Da-reum as Han Do-kyung.
Han Seok-hee's son.
 Kim Ji-young as Han Seok-hee
The police chief. 
 Park Ho-san as Kwon Jong-soo.
The governor of Jinyang-gun, where disaster struck.
 Park So-yi as Ha-yeong 
 Jo Hyun-woo
 Dong Hyun-bae as Kim Soon-kyung
 is a police officer and assistant who works with Han Suk-hee. 
 Jo Sang-ki as Il Ju-nim

Production 
On March 9, 2022, it has been confirmed that the drama will premiere at the Cannes International Series Festival 2022 from April 1 to April 6, 2022.

It aired on OCN from August 14, 2022 to August 28, 2022.

Ratings

References

External links
  
 
 

TVING original programming
South Korean television series
South Korean web series
Korean-language television shows
2022 South Korean television series debuts
2022 South Korean television series endings
Television series by Studio Dragon
South Korean drama web series